Frederick St George Unwin (23 April 1911 – 4 October 1990) was an English cricketer. He played for Essex between 1932 and 1951 as a right-handed lower-order batsman, and captained the team in 1939.

References

External links

1911 births
1990 deaths
English cricketers
Essex cricketers
People from Halstead
Free Foresters cricketers
Essex cricket captains